Shadley van Schalkwyk (born 5 August 1988) is a South African cricketer. He is a left-handed batsman and a right-arm medium-fast bowler who currently plays for The Knights. He was born in Cape Town.

Van Schalkwyk's first cricketing appearances came for Wynberg Boys' High School in a tour of Pakistan at the beginning of the 2006–07 season, playing against various Pakistani schools.

Van Schalkwyk made his List A debut in February 2008, scoring a steady 17 runs from the lower order, finishing not out. He made one further List A appearance during the season. He represented South Africa Academy at the Academy Cup competition of 2007–08. So far this season, Van Schalkwyk has made two List A appearances for Western Province.

Moving to The Knights for the 2008/2009, he has played 5 List A Matches for the amateur Free State side, and 1 First-class match for The Knights itself. He was included in the Free State cricket team squad for the 2015 Africa T20 Cup.

In August 2017, he was named in Nelson Mandela Bay Stars' squad for the first season of the T20 Global League. However, in October 2017, Cricket South Africa initially postponed the tournament until November 2018, with it being cancelled soon after.

In September 2018, he was named in Free State's squad for the 2018 Africa T20 Cup. In September 2019, he was named in Free State's squad for the 2019–20 CSA Provincial T20 Cup.

In June 2021, Shadley was named in the Minor League Cricket team for the Seattle Thunderbolts.

References

External links
Shadley van Schalkwyk at Cricket Archive

1988 births
Living people
Cricketers from Cape Town
South African cricketers
Free State cricketers
Western Province cricketers
Alumni of Wynberg Boys' High School